Antonín Procházka (born April 3, 1942) is a Czech former volleyball player who competed for Czechoslovakia in the 1968 Summer Olympics.

He was born in Brno.

In 1968 he was part of the Czechoslovak team which won the bronze medal in the Olympic tournament. He played eight matches.

External links
 
 

1942 births
Living people
Czech men's volleyball players
Czechoslovak men's volleyball players
Olympic volleyball players of Czechoslovakia
Volleyball players at the 1968 Summer Olympics
Olympic bronze medalists for Czechoslovakia
Sportspeople from Brno
Olympic medalists in volleyball
Medalists at the 1968 Summer Olympics